Ross, Michigan may refer to:

 Ross Township, Kalamazoo County, Michigan
 Ross, Kent County, Michigan, a small, mostly historic settlement